John Ferguson FRSE LLD (23 January 1837 – 2 November 1916) was a Scottish chemist and bibliographer. He is noted for the early alchemy and chemistry bibliography Bibliotheca chemica. He was generally nicknamed Soda Ferguson. The Ferguson Collection, a collection of 7,500 books and manuscripts from his personal library is held by the University of Glasgow.

Life
Ferguson was born on 24 January 1838 in Alloa, Scotland, the son of Elizabeth Donaldson and Adam Ferguson. He moved at an early age to Glasgow and attended Glasgow High School.

He graduated from the University of Glasgow with a BA in 1861 and an MA in 1862. In 1874, he was appointed the Regius Professor of Chemistry at the University of Glasgow, in place of Prof Thomas Anderson.

He was elected a Fellow of the Royal Society of Edinburgh in 1888. His proposers were Sir William Thomson (Lord Kelvin), James Thomson Bottomley, Peter Guthrie Tait and Alexander Crum Brown. The University of St Andrews awarded him an honorary doctorate (LLD).

Ferguson had an extensive library of books pertaining to alchemy, early chemistry, metallurgy, mineralogy, Paracelsus, the Romani language, the Rosicrucians, and witchcraft. In 1921 the University of Glasgow purchased about 11,000 of the books for the sum of £7,000.

He died of heart disease at his home, 6 Claremont Terrace in Glasgow, on 3 November 1916. He was aged 78.

He is buried in the family burial plot in Alloa.

Memberships
Royal Philosophical Society of Glasgow - President (1892–1895)
Glasgow Archaeological Society - President (1891–1894)
Royal Society of Edinburgh - Fellow
Society of Antiquaries of Scotland - Fellow
Chemical Society - Fellow
Royal Institute of Chemistry - Fellow
British Archaeological Association
French Archaeological Society
Honorary Fellow of the Imperial Military Academy of Medicine in Petrograd
Royal Company of Archers

Family
He married Helen Baird in 1882.

Bibliography
 Recent Inquiries Into the Early History of Chemistry (1879)
 The first history of chemistry (1886) Describes Robert Duval as the first historian of chemistry.
 Some early treatises on technological chemistry (1888) 
 Bibliotheca chemica: a catalogue of the alchemical, chemical and pharmaceutical books in the collection of the late James Young of Kelly and Durris (1906) in 2 vols.
 Books of secrets. A paper read before the Bibliographical Society, 21 April 1913 (1914)

References

External links
Biography of John Ferguson University of Glasgow

1838 births
1916 deaths
Scottish chemists
Alumni of the University of Glasgow
Academics of the University of Glasgow
Burials in Scotland
Regius Professors